Nello Santi (22 September 1931 – 6 February 2020) was an Italian conductor. He was associated with the Opernhaus Zürich for six decades, and was a regular conductor at the Metropolitan Opera in New York City. He was focused on Italian repertoire, especially operas by Verdi and Puccini, in a style following the tradition of Toscanini. He made sound and video recordings of Italian operas, including in 1971 Leoncavallo's Pagliacci with Plácido Domingo, Montserrat Caballé and Sherrill Milnes, in 1976 Montemezzi's L'amore dei tre re with Anna Moffo, Domingo and Pablo Elvira, in 2000 Verdi's I due Foscari, and in 2006 Donizetti's Don Pasquale in a Zürich production. Santi conducted from memory, and said "I love all of Verdi, but when he composed Rigoletto, Il trovatore and La traviata he was in a profound state of grace."

Life 

Santi was born on 22 September 1931 in Adria (Veneto), Kingdom of Italy, to Giovanni and Alfonsina Santi. His mother took him to an open-air performance of Verdi's Rigoletto at age four, which made a lasting impression. He learned to play several instruments as a child, and studied them further at the Liceo musicale of Padua.

In 1951, he made his debut as a conductor at the Teatro Verdi in Padua, conducting Rigoletto. At the theatre, he also occasionally worked as a prompter, conductor of the chorus, accompanist of singers in concerts, substitute orchestra player and actor on stage.

Santi was appointed music director of the Opernhaus Zürich in 1958, where he had first conducted Verdi's La forza del destino, sung in German. He married there in 1959. He remained until 1969, and returned to conduct for decades, including rarities such as Verdi's Ernani, I Lombardi and I due Foscari, Rossini's Semiramide, Bellini's Il Pirata and Donizetti's Poliuto.

As a guest, he conducted in 1960 at the Royal Opera House, at the Vienna State Opera and the Salzburg Festival. He had a contract with the Metropolitan Opera in New York City from 1962 when he made his debut with Verdi's Un ballo in maschera. He conducted more than 400 performances at the house. He conducted at many more opera houses all over the world including the Verona Arena.

Santi followed the tradition of Arturo Toscanini, to stay close to the score, accompanying the singers without overpowering them, but restraining "excessive liberties" in embellishments and drawn out notes. Santi was able to sing "any Italian opera vocal role from memory while conducting".

Santi retired to Riehen (canton Basel-Stadt), but still occasionally gave much-appreciated concerts in Basel and Zürich. He was often called "Papa Santi" by his fellow musicians to show their high respect for his work. In 2017, he was invited to conduct La traviata at La Scala in Milan, with Anna Netrebko in the title role, and Verdi's Nabucco, with Leo Nucci performing the title role.

Santi died in Zurich on 6 February 2020 at the age of 88 while undergoing treatment for a blood infection.

Recordings 
 1971: Leoncavallo's Pagliacci with Plácido Domingo, Montserrat Caballé, Sherrill Milnes; London Symphony Orchestra and Chorus; Audio CD:  RCA Red Seal
 1976: Montemezzi's L'amore dei tre re with Plácido Domingo, Anna Moffo, Cesare Siepi, Pablo Elvira; London Symphony Orchestra; Audio CD: RCA Red Seal
 1981: Umberto Giordano's Andrea Chénier with Plácido Domingo, Gabriela Beňačková,  Piero Cappuccilli; Vienna State Opera orchestra and chorus; DVD: Deutsche Grammophon
 1982: Puccini's La fanciulla del West with Carol Neblett, Plácido Domingo, Silvano Carroli; Royal Opera House Orchestra and Chorus; DVD: Kultur Video
 2000: Verdi's I due Foscari with Leo Nucci, Vincenzo La Scola, Alexandrina Pendatchanska; Teatro San Carlo Orchestra and Chorus; DVD: TDK
 2006: Donizetti's Don Pasquale with Juan Diego Florez, Isabel Rey, Ruggero Raimondi; Zurich Opera Orchestra; DVD; DECCA

References

External links 
 Nello Santi biography
 
 
 
 

1931 births
2020 deaths
People from the Province of Rovigo
Italian male conductors (music)
20th-century Italian conductors (music)
21st-century Italian conductors (music)
20th-century Italian male musicians
21st-century Italian male musicians